The 1969–70 FIBA Women's European Champions Cup was the eleventh edition of FIBA's competition for women's basketball national champion clubs, running from November 1969 to April 1970. Daugava Riga defeated Wisła Kraków, which became the first Polish team to reach the final, to win its seventh title in a row. Albania withdrew from the competition.

Qualifying round

Round of 10

Group stage

Group A

Group B

Semifinals

Finals

References

Champions Cup
European
European
EuroLeague Women seasons